The Buckles Mine is an historical uranium mine located approximately 4.5 km southeast of Elliot Lake, Ontario, owned and operated by Rio Algom Ltd. The site has been rehabilitated. Environmental monitoring is ongoing as part of the monitoring for the nearby Nordic Mine.

History 
The mine was owned by Buckles Algoma Uranium Mines Limited, and was bought in 1955 by Spanish American Mines Limited in 1955.

1955 reserves were indicated to be 486,500 tons at 0.124% U308 in a 10 feet thick zone located 75 feet underground.

About 500 tons of ore was shipped to the Spanish American mine for processing daily.

The mine was in operation from 1957 to 1958, during which time it produced 276,000 tonnes of ore.

Other mines in the area
 Stanleigh Mine
 Spanish American Mine
 Can-Met Mine
 Milliken Mine
 Panel Mine
 Denison Mine
 Stanrock Mine
 Quirke Mine(s)
 Pronto Mine
 Lacnor Mine
 Nordic Mine

See also

Quartz-pebble conglomerate deposits
Uranium mining
List of uranium mines
List of mines in Ontario

References

External links 
 
 

Uranium mines in Ontario
Mines in Elliot Lake
Underground mines in Canada
Former mines in Ontario